The Queensland Railways 4D9 class locomotive was a class of 2-4-2T steam locomotives operated by the Queensland Railways.

History
In February 1881, two Dübs & Co two 2-4-2T locomotives entered service on the Bundaberg Railway. Per Queensland Railway's classification system they were designated the 4D9 class, the 4 representing the number of driving wheels, the D that it was a tank locomotive, and the 9 the cylinder diameter in inches.

Class list

References

Dübs locomotives
Railway locomotives introduced in 1881
4D9
3 ft 6 in gauge locomotives of Australia
2-4-2T locomotives